Maureen Lucille Hemphill (born January 26, 1937) was a Manitoba politician.  She served in the cabinet of NDP Premier Howard Pawley, and was an unsuccessful candidate for the party's leadership in 1988.

She was born Maureen Lucille Miller, the daughter of James Leroy Miller and Elaine Agnes McParlor, in Grand Forks, British Columbia, and was educated at Bralorne.  She served on the Assiniboine South School Board in 1969, 1970 and 1973. She married H. David Hemphill but they had divorced by the 1980s.

Hemphill first ran for the provincial legislature in 1977, in the southwest Winnipeg riding of Charleswood.  She was defeated by Progressive Conservative leader Sterling Lyon, whose party defeated Edward Schreyer's New Democratic Party to win the election.

The Manitoba NDP regained power under Howard Pawley in 1981, and Hemphill was easily elected for the north Winnipeg riding of Logan (former Mayor Steve Juba was a distant second).  Hemphill was appointed Minister of Education on November 30, 1981, and retained this position for the entirety of the Pawley government's first mandate.  She increased state support for private and parochial schools while holding this portfolio, despite the NDP's historical objections to such funding.

Hemphill was re-elected without difficulty in 1986 (defeating future Liberal MLA Kevin Lamoureux), and was appointed Minister of Business Development and Tourism on April 17, 1986.  On September 21, 1987, a cabinet shuffle made her the Minister of Community Services.

When the Pawley government lost a parliamentary vote of non-confidence in 1988, Hemphill was one of four candidates to become the party's new leader. She placed fourth on the first ballot, and gave her support to third-place candidate Andy Anstett, who was eliminated on the second ballot.

Hemphill was again re-elected in 1988, albeit by a reduced margin.  She was not a candidate in 1990.

In 1993, Hemphill ran for the national New Democratic Party in the riding of Winnipeg North Centre, but placed second to incumbent Liberal David Walker.

References

1937 births
Living people
New Democratic Party of Manitoba MLAs
Women MLAs in Manitoba
Members of the Executive Council of Manitoba
Women government ministers of Canada